The Barbados anole (Anolis extremus) is a species of anole lizard that is native to Barbados, an island-nation in the Caribbean.  Originally endemic to Barbados, it has since been introduced to Saint Lucia and Bermuda. It was previously treated as a subspecies of Martinique's anole, A. roquet.

Males have pale lavender to blue-gray heads, with blue eyelids.  Their dorsal surfaces are deep green with dark markings and occasionally white spots, and their bellies are yellow.  Females are smaller and duller in color and may have a mid-dorsal stripe.

It has been reported in Florida since the 1990s, though this is likely due to repeated introductions and escapes as a sustained, breeding population has not been confirmed.

See also
List of Anolis lizards

Notes

References

.
.

External links

Anolis extremus at the Encyclopedia of Life
Anolis extremus at the Reptile Database

Anoles
Lizards of the Caribbean
Endemic fauna of Barbados
Reptiles of Barbados
Reptiles of Saint Lucia
Reptiles described in 1887
Taxa named by Samuel Garman